

Hans Wagner (11 March 1896 – 13 May 1967) was a German general in the Wehrmacht of Nazi Germany during World War II who commanded the 269th Infantry Division.  He was a recipient of the Knight's Cross of the Iron Cross.

Awards and decorations

 Knight's Cross of the Iron Cross on  18 April 1943 as Oberst and commander of Artillerie-Regiment 5

References

Citations

Bibliography

 

1896 births
1967 deaths
People from Saarbrücken
People from the Rhine Province
German Army personnel of World War I
Recipients of the clasp to the Iron Cross, 1st class
Recipients of the Gold German Cross
Recipients of the Knight's Cross of the Iron Cross
German police officers
Lieutenant generals of the German Army (Wehrmacht)
German Army generals of World War II
Military personnel from Saarland